Sinohydro (Chinese: 中国水电; long form: 中国水利水电建设集团公司) is a Chinese  state-owned hydropower engineering and construction company.  In the 2012 Engineering News-Record Top 225 Global Contractors, a ranking by annual revenue, the company is 14th by overall position, and 6th among Chinese construction companies.

History 
The company was founded in 1950, and is based in Beijing, China.

International expansion

The company has  gone on the path of international expansion, becoming a "face of China expansion" across the world by pursuing operations in 55 countries across Asia, Africa, Europe (from the European headquarters of Belgrade, Serbia), North America, and South America. these days Sinohydro is expanding into the Israeli market and constructing a hydro-electric station in Kochav-Hayarden.

In the course of international expansion, the company has run into bumps ranging from political risk to environmental controversy. Workers of the affiliated company Power Construction Corporation were abducted in 2012 by the Sudan People's Liberation Movement-North while building a road in Sudan. In a Daily Star article dated Aug 4, 2014, it admitted to being under temporary debarment by the World Bank in response to a query by Bangladesh government with reference to a bid placed for the Padma Bridge project.

In Malaysia, the company worked on a joint venture with Sime Engineering to build the largest dam in the country.  The Sarawak Report, alleged that Sinohydro had widely used a technique involving adding excessive water to cement, making the construction unsafe.  Sinohydro responded that the dam was safe but some work like the cleaning of silos wasn't done "following instructions". The webpage of the Sarawak Report was hacked after it published the story.

Operations
The main operating company of the group is Sinohydro Ltd which is a major subsidiary formed from units of the Group parent and Sinohydro Consulting and now held through a holding company Sinohydro Group Limited.

The company engages in architectural projects, electric power investment, house property and real estate, research and development, and design and manufacture of construction equipment. It provides investment, project financing, consultation, and construction services. The company also engages in the manufacture and installation of mechanical and electrical plants. It trades in water conservancy, power generation, expressway, railway, harbor and sea-route, airport, municipal public utility, and building industries.

Projects
 2016 - Location: Cochav-Hayarden area, near Kibuz Gesher, Emek Hamaayanot (former Emek Bet Shean) financed by Tahal, Noy fund and Hatchison water. This is the first project of Sinohydro in Israel which the company is the EPC and will complete its obligations by December 2022.
The management and operation of the hydro-electric power station will be delivered to the IEC upon completion of the project in the end of 2022.

 2012
 2013
 2014:
Selected by the government of Bangladesh for River Training Works(14 km length) of the Padma Bridge Padma Multi-Purpose Bridge in Lohajong, South of capital Dhaka. Contract Period : 4 years+1year (defect liability period). Contract Cost : BDT: 8707.81 crore. Date of work order : 31 December 2014. Date of Completion : Physical Progress of Work : Handed over land to Contractor, Mobilization of equipments & procurement of materials as well as Contractor's accommodation, stack yard, casting yard etc. construction are going on.
 2013: Sinohydro selected by Government of Pakistan to construct WAPDA Tarbela IV Power Plant since September 2013
 2012: Selected by Nigerian government to construct the Zungeru hydropower station, project worth NGN 162 billion or US$1.013 billion.
 2012: Selected by a local government in Georgia to construct a ring road, project worth GEL 210 million or US$129 million.
 2013: Selected by Government of Uganda to construct Karuma Power Station, a 600 Megawatt power station, the largest in the country. Construction costs estimated at approximately US$2.2 billion.
  Building the Port of Hambantota in Sri Lanka, which will become the largest port in South Asia by 2014. It also engaged in the constructions of Moragahakanda reservoir as well.
 2013: Selected by Algerian government to construct the photovoltaics centrales.
: Selected by the Honduran private company, Desarrollos Energéticos SA (DESA) to build the controversial Rio Blanco dam.
: Selected by Qatar Government to Construct New Hamad Port in 2015. The Project estimated cost is 1.3 billion Riyal. Project includes 57 building which includes substations as well, required for the electric supply of the Port administration area.
: Won the bid in 2016 to build the new Mellegue dam near El Kef.

See also
Electric power industry in China
Renewable energy in China

References

External links

Companies based in Beijing
Construction and civil engineering companies of China
Renewable energy in China
Trading companies of China
Government-owned companies of China
Construction and civil engineering companies established in 1950
Chinese companies established in 1950